Magic Lizard (lit: Magic lizard) is a 1985 Thai fantasy monster adventure film directed and produced by Sompote Sands. The film's plot follows a large frilled lizard who sets out to retrieve a crystal stolen by aliens.

Summary
Magic Lizard is a large lizard who guards the crystal under the base of the pagoda of the Temple of Dawn. After Martians stole the crystal, Magic Lizard enlists the aid of the giant guardian as he escapes to various locations throughout Thailand, including Bridge on the River Kwai and Phae Mueang Phi. Over the course of the film, Magic Lizard flees from man-eating crocodile, wild elephants, tiger, a mother and baby black bear, run away from train, giant mosquitoes and skeleton ghost in treasure cave.

Production

Magic Lizard was inspired by Sompote Sands' nephew, who had brought home a frilled lizard from Austria.

Release and reception
The film was released in Japan by NHK as エリマケトカゲ一人旅 (Erimaketokage hitoritabi; lit: "frilled lizard lonely travel"). When it was released in Thailand, it was not expected to garner commercial success due to copyright infringements and the lack of a drafted copyright law.

In February 2022, the film screened at the 11th Madrid International Cutre Film Festival, also known as CutreCon, in Spain. Discussing the film ahead of the festival, CutreCon director Carlos Palencia stated, "I cannot recommend this film enough, because it seems conceived by an extraterrestrial civilization. I didn't understand anything the first time I saw it. [...] it seems like a children's movie, but suddenly there is an alien invasion and there begins to be nudity, scenes of incomprehensible violence and other things I can't reveal because I don't want to ruin the movie. [...] I have not seen anything else like it, because nothing else like it exists."

References

External links
 

Films directed by Sompote Sands
1985 films
1980s monster movies
Thai comedy horror films
1985 fantasy films
Films set in Thailand
Films shot in Thailand
1980s comedy horror films
1980s adventure films
1985 comedy films